Quesada may refer to:

People
 Quesada (surname)

Places
 Quesada, Spain, a town in the province of Jaén, in Andalusia
 Ciudad Quesada, Alicante, a town in the province of Alicante, in Valencia, Spain
 Quesada, Costa Rica, a city and district in the canton of San Carlos in the province of Alajuela
 Quesada, Guatemala, a municipality

Other
 Quesada (cicada), an insect genus in the family Cicadidae
 Quesada pasiega, a typical dessert of the Pas valley in Cantabria, Spain; made mainly of fresh cheese, butter, flour and eggs

See also
de Quesada
 Quezada